Paul Murphy (born 2 August 1991) is an Irish Gaelic footballer who plays for the Rathmore club and at senior level for the Kerry county team since 2014. He usually plays as a midfielder of centre half forward. He has captained Kerry. He won an All Star Award in 2014 and received a nomination in 2016.

Murphy started the 2014 All-Ireland Senior Football Championship Final at right half back and received the man of the match award.

Honours
Rathmore
Kerry Club Football Championship: (1) 2011
Kerry Intermediate Football Championship: (1) 2022
All-Ireland Intermediate Club Football Championship: (1) 2023
East Kerry Senior Football Championship: (4) 2014, 2015, 2016, 2017

East Kerry
Kerry Senior Football Championship: (1) 2020, 2022 (c)

Kerry
All-Ireland Senior Football Championship: (2) 2014, 2022
Munster Senior Football Championship: (8) 2014, 2015, 2016, 2017, 2018, 2019, 2021(c), 2022
National Football League: (4) 2017, 2020, 2021, 2022

Individual
 All Star: (1) 2014
 All-Ireland Senior Football Championship Final Man of the Match (1) 2014

References

1991 births
Living people
All Stars Awards winners (football)
Irish accountants
Kerry inter-county Gaelic footballers
Rathmore Gaelic footballers